Działy may refer to the following places:
Działy, Kutno County in Łódź Voivodeship (central Poland)
Działy, Sieradz County in Łódź Voivodeship (central Poland)
Działy, Wieluń County in Łódź Voivodeship (central Poland)
Działy, Ciechanów County in Masovian Voivodeship (east-central Poland)
Działy, Gostynin County in Masovian Voivodeship (east-central Poland)
Działy, Warmian-Masurian Voivodeship (north Poland)